Leucobacter chromiireducens is a bacterium that was first isolated from a chromium-contaminated environment.

References

External links
LPSN
Type strain of Leucobacter chromiireducens at BacDive -  the Bacterial Diversity Metadatabase

Microbacteriaceae
Bacteria described in 2005